Eiterfeld is a municipality in the district of Fulda, in Hesse, Germany. It is situated in the north of the district, 25 km north of Fulda.

See also
 Schloss Buchenau
 Burg Fürsteneck

References

External links
 Official site 
 Schloss Buchenau 
 Burg Fürsteneck 

Fulda (district)